The 2009 Pacific Nations Cup is a rugby union tournament held between five national sides on the Pacific Rim: Fiji, Japan, Samoa, Tonga and the Junior All Blacks. The New Zealand Māori team that won the tournament last year will no longer take part in this competition because of a decision taken by the New Zealand Rugby Union. Australia A has also decided to pull out due to a similar decision. The inaugural competition was held in 2006. This year the tournament will begin on June 12 and ends on July 3, 2009 and most of the matches will be hosted by Fiji. The awarding of the key international tournament to the Fiji Rugby Union represents a further boost to the continued development of rugby in the region. The two opening round matches will be played outside of Fiji with Samoa hosting the Junior All Blacks in Apia and Tonga entertaining the Fijians in Nukuʻalofa the following day before the tournament moves to Fiji for a 17-day festival of international rugby spread across three match venues: the ANZ National Stadium (Suva), Churchill Park (Lautoka) and Lawaqa Park (Sigatoka).

The tournament is a round-robin where each team plays all of the other teams once. There are four points for a win, two for a draw and none for a defeat. There are also bonus points offered with one bonus point for scoring four or more tries in a match and one bonus point for losing by 7 points or less.

Table

Schedule

Round 1

Round 2

Round 3

Round 4

Round 5

Top scorers

Top points scorers

Source: irb.com

Top try scorers

Source: irb.com

See also 

2009 IRB Nations Cup

References

External links
IRB Pacific Nations Cup - from the IRB website (June 12, 2009)
Schedule - IRB website (pdf)
Fiji to host ANZ Pacific Nations Cup 2009  - IRB website, 22 May 2009

2007
2009 rugby union tournaments for national teams
2009 in Oceanian rugby union
2009 in Fijian rugby union
2009 in Samoan rugby union
2009 in Tongan rugby union
2009 in New Zealand rugby union
2008–09 in Japanese rugby union